Centrolene solitaria (common name: lonely Cochran frog) is a species of frog in the family Centrolenidae. Known only from its type locality in Florencia, Caquetá, it is endemic to Colombia.

Centrolene solitaria occurs in vegetation near streams in cloud forests, including secondary forests. A major threat to this species is habitat loss.

References

solitaria
Amphibians of Colombia
Endemic fauna of Colombia
Taxonomy articles created by Polbot
Amphibians described in 1991